The Perini Building Company is a division of Tutor Perini Corporation. Founded in 1894, Perini Building Company is one of the oldest American construction companies still in operation today.  Perini Building Company specializes in the construction of commercial, industrial, healthcare, science and technology, and hospitality projects. The company has undertaken a wide range of projects, from the construction of the U.S. Embassy in Moscow, Russia to the expansion of the San Diego Convention Center.

Projects 
 CityCenter
Trump Las Vegas
Boston Worcester Turnpike
Thomas and Mack Center
Hard Rock Hotel and Casino
Harrah's Las Vegas
Pala Casino Resort and Spa
The Palms
Mohegan Sun
Sheraton Phoenix Downtown
Cosmopolitan of Las Vegas
Hudson Yards Redevelopment Project

References 

Real estate companies of the United States
Companies based in Arizona